Tiger is a studio album by New Zealand band Superette, released in 1996.

Track listing
Side A
Kiss Someone - 3:11   
Touch Me - 2:50   
Ugly Things - 3:55   
Saskatchewan - 5:31   
Bye Bye - :40   
Felo De Se - 4:19   
Side B
Cannibal - 2:59   
I Got It Clean - 3:26   
Taiwan - 3:16   
Funny Weather - 1:46   
Killer Clown - 3:47   
Waves -3:20

Personnel
Ben Howe - bass, vocals, guitar
Greta Anderson - drums, vocals
Dave Mulcahy - guitar, vocals, piano

References

1996 albums
Superette (band) albums